Andrew Thacker (born May 31, 1985) is an American football coach.  He is the defensive coordinator and linebackers coach at the Georgia Institute of Technology. After a standout high school career at North Forsyth High School in Cumming, Georgia and Gainesville High School in Gainesville, Georgia, Thacker attended and played college football at Furman University (2004–2007), where he was a three-year starter at safety. Thacker was the Southern Conference's Freshman of the Year in 2004 and went 35–15 during his time as a Paladin.

Coaching career
After graduating from Furman, Thacker coached at UCF, Oklahoma State, Southern Miss, the NFL's Atlanta Falcons, Kennesaw State and back at UCF before becoming Temple's linebacker coach underneath Geoff Collins in 2017. After a year as linebackers coach, Thacker was promoted to defensive coordinator in 2018.

References

External links
 Georgia Tech profile

1985 births
Living people
American football defensive backs
Atlanta Falcons coaches
Furman Paladins football players
Georgia Tech Yellow Jackets football coaches
Kennesaw State Owls football coaches
Oklahoma State Cowboys football coaches
Southern Miss Golden Eagles football coaches
Temple Owls football coaches
UCF Knights football coaches
People from Cartersville, Georgia
People from Cumming, Georgia
People from Gainesville, Georgia
Sportspeople from the Atlanta metropolitan area
Coaches of American football from Georgia (U.S. state)
Players of American football from Georgia (U.S. state)